Orb or Orbs may refer to:

 Sphere
 Globus Cruciger  Ceremonial Orb

Places and rivers
 Orb (river), in southern France
 Orb (Kinzig), a tributary of the Kinzig river in Germany
 Bad Orb, a town in Hesse, Germany

Literature, radio, film, television
 Orb Kaftan, a character from the Incarnations of Immortality novel series by Piers Anthony
 Orb (comics), a Marvel Comics villain
 "Orb" (Adventure Time), a television episode
 Orb Publications, an Australian publishing company
 Orb Speculative Fiction, an Australian magazine
 Orbs, sacred objects of the Bajoran species in the TV series Star Trek: Deep Space Nine
 Orbing, a magical form of teleportation in the television show Charmed
 Ultraman Orb, a 2016 Japanese tokusatsu television series
 Ostdeutscher Rundfunk Brandenburg, a former German public broadcasting organization

Music
 The Orb, a British electronic music group
 O.R.B. (band) (formerly The Original Rude Boys), an Irish acoustic group
 Orbs (band), a rock group featuring members of Between the Buried and Me and Fear Before the March of Flames
 Orb (Boiled in Lead album), 1990
 Orb (Alastair Galbraith album), 2007
 The Oak Ridge Boys, a country music group

Computing
 Object request broker, a distributed computing concept
 Orb (software), a streaming media application
 Castlewood Orb Drive, a 3.5-inch removable hard disk drive
 Oriented FAST and rotated BRIEF (ORB), an image processing method
 Open Relay Behavior-modification System (ORBS), a defunct system for blocking suspected Internet spam sites

Celestial matters
 Orb (astrology), a measurement of object interaction
 Celestial orb, a central concept in ancient and early-modern astronomy

Transport
 ORB, IATA code for Örebro Airport in Sweden
 ORB, FAA code for Orr Regional Airport in Minnesota
 ORB, Amtrak code for Old Orchard Beach station in Maine
 ORBS, former ICAO code for Baghdad International Airport

Business
 ORB International, a London-based polling agency
 Orbital Sciences Corporation (former NYSE stock ticker: ORB)

Other
 O-ring boss seal, a hydraulic fitting
 Organic radical battery, a type of rechargeable battery
 Globus cruciger, an orb-and-cross symbol of Christian authority
 Sovereign's Orb, a Crown Jewel of the United Kingdom
 The trademarked symbol printed on genuine Harris Tweed
 O.R.B: Off-World Resource Base, a 2002 computer game
 Orb web, a type of spider web
 Orb (horse), the winner of the 2013 Kentucky Derby
 Orb (optics), a type of photographic imperfection
 Yard globe
 "The orb", a symbolic object featured during the 2017 Arab Islamic American Summit

See also 
 Orbis (disambiguation)